Henry George Victor John Crichton, 6th Earl Erne, KCVO (9 July 1937 – 23 December 2015), was an Anglo-Irish peer and a Lord Lieutenant of Fermanagh. He was known to his family and friends as Harry Erne.

Biography
Lord Erne was the eldest son of the 5th Earl Erne and his wife Davina (Lady Davidema Katharine Cynthia Mary Millicent Bulwer-Lytton), a younger daughter of the 2nd Earl of Lytton, and was a godchild of King George VI.

He inherited his father's titles in 1940, a few weeks before his third birthday, when his father was killed in action in the Second World War. In 1945 he gained a step-father when his mother married secondly Montague Woodhouse, a Conservative Member of Parliament who in 1998 would succeed his elder brother as the 5th Baron Terrington. In due course he gained two half-brothers, Christopher, now 6th Baron Terrington, and Nicholas, and a half-sister, Emma Davinia Mary.

He was educated at Eton. In 1952, he was briefly a Page of Honour to George VI and continued in the same capacity after Elizabeth II came to the throne, until 1954. From 1960 to 1968, he was a junior officer in the North Irish Horse. 

He was a member of the Royal Ulster Agricultural Society and the Royal Forestry Society and was Lord Lieutenant of Fermanagh from 1986 to 2012. Erne was appointed Knight Commander of the Royal Victorian Order (KCVO) in the 2012 New Year Honours List, for his services as Lord-Lieutenant.

He died on 23 December 2015, aged 78.

Marriages and children
On 5 November 1958, Lord Erne married Camilla Roberts, elder daughter of the aviator Owen Roberts, himself grandson of wealthy American businessman Marshall Owen Roberts. She was a cousin to The 12th Baron Farnham and second cousin to The 10th Duke of Atholl. They had five children:

 Lady Cleone Lucinda Crichton (born 27 August 1959)
 Lady Davina Jane Crichton (born 25 June 1961)
 Lady Katherine Patricia Crichton (born 4 November 1962)
 Lady Tara Guinevere Crichton (born 9 May 1967)
 John Henry Michael Ninian Crichton, 7th Earl Erne (born 19 June 1971)

In 1980 he was divorced from his first wife and on 21 June 1980 married Anna Hitchcock, née Bjorck, who survives him.

Footnotes

References
Burke's Peerage & Gentry, 107th edition

External links

1937 births
2015 deaths
Knights Commander of the Royal Victorian Order
Lord-Lieutenants of Fermanagh
People educated at Eton College
Pages of Honour
North Irish Horse officers
Earls Erne

Erne